Kid Galahad is a 1962 American musical film starring Elvis Presley as a boxer. It was released by United Artists in August 1962 and opened at #9 at the American box office. Variety ranked it #37 on its list of the top-grossing films of 1962.

Kid Galahad was shot on location in Idyllwild, California. Its supporting cast includes Gig Young, Lola Albright and Charles Bronson. Some critics rate the film as one of Elvis Presley's best performances.

The film is a remake of the 1937 version (in which United Artists Television through Associated Artists Productions distributed for TV airings at that time) starring Edward G. Robinson, Bette Davis and Humphrey Bogart and directed by Michael Curtiz, who also directed the 1958 Presley film King Creole.

Plot
Willy Grogan is a small-time boxing promoter and innkeeper based in the Catskills resort region of Cream Valley, New York. He is a contemptible man who is in debt and pays little attention to the woman who loves him, Dolly, a chain-smoking, love-starved woman residing at the camp. Walter Gulick arrives, a young man recently discharged from the army who loves the peaceful setting almost as much as he loves working on old cars. Walter wishes to find work as a mechanic at a nearby garage.

When Willy's younger sister Rose shows up unexpectedly, she becomes interested in Walter. Willy objects because he doesn't want Rose to fall for a "grease monkey" mechanic and two-bit boxer. Dolly is envious of the young couple's romance and resents Willy's interference.

Walter, in need of work, accepts a job as a sparring partner and knocks out one of Willy's top fighters. Willy is persuaded to let Walter, known as Galahad, try his hand in a real bout. Both men are reluctant but need money. Walter begins training under the watchful eye of Willy's top trainer Lew.

After several successes in the ring, Walter is readied for his biggest fight. Gangsters want him to take a dive so that Willy can pay off his debts to them, but Walter throws his muscle behind Willy and emerges victorious. He wins the big fight against Ramon "Sugar Boy" Romero as well as Willy's approval, retiring undefeated to his vintage car and his new love.

Cast
 Elvis Presley as Walter Gulick
 Gig Young as Willy Grogan
 Lola Albright as Dolly Fletcher
 Joan Blackman as Rose Grogan
 Charles Bronson as Lew Nyack
 David Lewis as Otto Danzig
 Robert Emhardt as Maynard
 Roy Roberts as Jerry Bathgate
 Liam Redmond as Father Higgins
 Judson Pratt as Howard Zimmerman
 Ned Glass as Max Lieberman
 Ed Asner as Frank Gerson (uncredited)
 Red West as Opponent (uncredited)
 Del "Sonny" West as Bit Part (uncredited)
 Joe Esposito as Bit Part (uncredited)
 Michael Dante as Joie Shakes
 Richard Devon as Marvin
 Mushy Callahan as Romero Fight Referee
 Orlando de la Fuentes as Ramon "Sugarboy" Romero 
 George J. Lewis as Romero's trainer
 Harold 'Tommy' Hart as Referee
 John Gonsalves (Gonzalves) as Presley's stunt double
Chester Morris as man in the crowd
De la Fuente was the reigning welterweight champion at the time.

Production
Former light welterweight world champion Mushy Callahan trained Presley for his role. Callahan, who also appears in the film as a referee, had a long career as a professional boxing referee after retiring from the ring as a fighter. According to Callahan, he threw all of the punches in the close-up scenes in which Presley is struck in the face. He taught Presley how to move his head backward as the punches were being delivered so that each blow either missed him or barely touched him. Callahan considered Presley to be an excellent athlete.

Shooting began in early November 1961 at Hidden Lodge, Idyllwild, California before a storm forced a move to Hollywood.

Soundtrack

Reception
Bosley Crowther of The New York Times suggested that Presley was miscast as a boxer, writing that he was "certainly no model for a statue of Hercules, and his skill at projecting an illusion of ferocity is of very low degree." However, Crowther found the film to be "moderately genial entertainment. It's not explosive, but it has the cheerful top of a lightly romantic contrivance that ranges between comedy and spoof. For this we can thank the other actors who played their roles ardently and Phil Karlson, who has directed at a brisk and deceptive pace."

Harrison's Reports graded the film as "Good": "Presley is surrounded by some very nice people. In lending him support, they give strength to a run-of-the-mill story that plays itself out with a simplicity of appeal and bountiful residue of entertainment. The film manages to give a pleasing account of itself."

A less positive notice in Variety read: "The story may be old, the direction not especially perceptive, the performances in several cases pretty poor, but United Artists' 'Kid Galahad' is apt to be a moneymaker in spite of all this."

John L. Scott in the Los Angeles Times called the story "old hat" but thought that it "should more than satisfy the horde of Presley fans."

The Monthly Film Bulletin wrote: "If the wit and intelligence lavished on the excellent dialogue had also been used to give a shred of ingenuity to the plot or a momentary sparkle to the lyrics, this would have been a much more amusing comedy ... Elvis Presley repeats the amiable oaf performance he gave recently in Follow That Dream, but it is nowhere near as funny, partly because his farcical opportunities are fewer, but mainly because it is hard to laugh continually at someone whose face is seen a couple of times bruised and bleeding in the ring."

Kid Galahad holds a 50% rating on Rotten Tomatoes based on six reviews.

See also
 List of American films of 1962
Elvis Presley on film and television
Elvis Presley discography

References

External links
 
 Behind the Scenes look at Kid Galahad at Elvis Presley News.com
 Review by Graeme Clark at The Spinning Image
 Review by Dan Mancini at DVD Verdict, June 23, 2006
 Review by DSH at The DVD Journal
 Region 2 Review by Anthony Nield at DVD Times, 11-09-2003
 Region 2 Review by Nigel Patterson at Elvis Information Network, October 21, 2003

1962 films
1960s English-language films
1962 musical films
1960s sports films
American musical films
American boxing films
Films set in New York (state)
Films directed by Phil Karlson
Musical film remakes
1960s American films
English-language musical films